The Golden Argosy: The Most Celebrated Short Stories in the English Language is an anthology edited by Charles Grayson and Van H. Cartmell, and published by Dial Press in 1955. It is famous for being the favorite book of novelist Stephen King.

Stories
  
• I'm a fool by Sherwood Anderson

• The happy hypocrite by Max Beerbohm

• The devil and Daniel Webster by Stephen Vincent Benét
 
• The damned thing by Ambrose Bierce

• The Chink and the child by Thomas Burke

• Paul's case by Willa Cather

• Back for Christmas by John Collier

• Youth by Joseph Conrad

• The bar sinister by Richard Harding Davis

• The Red-Headed League by Arthur Conan Doyle

• A rose for Emily by William Faulkner

• Old Man Minick by Edna Ferber

• The rich boy by F. Scott Fitzgerald

• The celestial omnibus by E.M. Forster

• The three strangers by Thomas Hardy

• The outcasts of Poker Flat by Bret Harte

• The killers by Ernest Hemingway

• The gift of the Magi by O. Henry

• The Gioconda smile by Aldous Huxley

• The monkey's paw by W.W. Jacobs

• The man who would be king by Rudyard Kipling

• The incarnation of Krishna Mulvaney by Rudyard Kipling

• Champion by Ring Lardner

• To build a fire by Jack London

• The Fly by Katherine Mansfield

• Rain by W. Somerset Maugham

• Big blonde by Dorothy Parker

• The murders in the Rue Morgue by Edgar Allan Poe

• The gold-bug by Edgar Allan Poe

• Flowering Judas by Katherine Anne Porter

• Tobermory by Saki

• The leader of the people by John Steinbeck

• Markheim by Robert L. Stevenson
 
• A lodging for the night by Robert L. Stevenson

• The lady or the tiger? by Frank R. Stockton

• Monsieur Beaucaire by Booth Tarkington

• The secret life of Walter Mitty by James Thurber

• The celebrated jumping frog of Calaveras County by Mark Twain

• The other wise man by Henry Van Dyke

• Chickamauga by Thomas Wolfe

1955 anthologies
American anthologies
Fiction anthologies